The Clemson University Historic District I is a collection of historic properties on the campus of Clemson University in Clemson, South Carolina. The district contains eight contributing properties located along the northern portion of the campus.  Included are some of the oldest academic buildings on campus.  It was listed on the National Register of Historic Places in 1990.

Contributing properties

See also
Clemson University Historic District II
Campus of Clemson University

References

Historic District I
Historic districts on the National Register of Historic Places in South Carolina
National Register of Historic Places in Pickens County, South Carolina
University and college buildings on the National Register of Historic Places in South Carolina
Late 19th and Early 20th Century American Movements architecture
Victorian architecture in South Carolina